The 1985 African Cup of Champions Clubs was the 21st edition of the annual international club football competition held in the CAF region (Africa), the African Cup of Champions Clubs. It determined that year's club champion of association football in Africa.

37 teams played in the tournament.  The tournament consisted of six rounds of two-legged matches. FAR Rabat from Morocco won the final and became for the first time CAF club champion.

Preliminary round

|}
1

First round

|}
1 
2 
3

Second round

|}

Quarter-finals

|}

Semi-finals

|}

Final

Champion

Top scorers

The top scorers from the 1985 African Cup of Champions Clubs are as follows:

References
Champions' Cup 1985 - rsssf.com

1
African Cup of Champions Clubs